John Rawling is a British boxing,  track and field, darts and yachting commentator, currently working for BT Sport, ITV and Talksport. He has become known as one of the best known voices of boxing commentary. With BT, John commentates alongside former World Super-Middleweight champion Richie Woodhall, while former World Cruiserweight champion Glenn McCrory is his co-commentator with Talksport. On ITV darts broadcasts, John commentates with Chris Mason, Stuart Pyke, Dan Dawson and Alan Warriner-Little, while Mason and Paul Nicholson are alongside him for Talksport darts coverage.
John also commentates on Paralympic sports for Channel 4. He was the lead commentator for Channel 4 in their award-winning coverage of the 2012 Paralympics in London and the 2011 IAAF World Athletics Championships in Korea. 

Channel 4 received a BAFTA for Best Live Sports Broadcast for their coverage of the Paralympics and also received a special award from the Royal Television Society. He has subsequently commentated on all major Para events, including the Rio Paralympics of 2016 and the Winter Paralympics in 2014 and 2018. His work has also included acting as lead commentator in the Americas Cup World Series of yachting. Previously, he was the main boxing commentator on ITV after boxing returned to the network in September 2005. In 2007, he was named Sports Commentator of the Year by the Royal Television Society for his work in ITV Sport's The Big Fight Live. John also commentated on boxing for Sky Television and Setanta.

Before joining ITV, John was an award-winning commentator on BBC Radio, covering major athletics meetings across the world from 1988 as BBC Athletics Correspondent, winning the Sony Radio Sports Commentator of the Year award, and also broadcasting numerous world title boxing bouts.

Previous work experienced includes a spell at the Mansfield Chad, Roland Orton's Leicester News Service and BBC Radio Leicester.

Education
Rawling was educated at King Edward VII, Sheffield and Manchester University.

Broadcasting career
Rawling previously commentated on boxing and athletics for BBC Radio, and was named Sony Radio Sports Broadcaster of the Year in 1994. He was the lead commentator at four Olympic Games from Barcelona in 1992 to Athens in 2004. He was covering major title fights for the BBC from 1987 until 2005. He contributed some boxing commentary on BBC television.  He also reported football matches, cricket and golf for BBC Radio. His long-term commentating partner on Radio 5 Live, Duke McKenzie, a former world boxing champion at three weights, moved to ITV at the same time as Rawling. Rawling commentated for Setanta Sports, before it went into administration, alongside Richie Woodhall, who co-commentates on BBC Radio at other times, and Steve Bunce. He has also commentated for ESPN on The Contender Series and on the Prime pay per view network. Rawling is currently commentating on boxing for BT Sport and BoxNation alongside Richie Woodhall and Barry Jones

From the start of the 2007/08 season to 2008/09, John commentated for ITV on The Championship, the Sunday morning Football League highlights programme and was a regular contributor to Champions League and FA Cup broadcasts. He has also commentated on football for various other broadcast organisations, including 2010 World Cup and Premier League for Talksport radio and he provides television commentaries for the Premier League, broadcast on their world feed. John also commentates on darts for ITV4 and ESPN. He was lead commentator on the 2012 Paralympics in London for Channel 4 and also for the 2011 IAAF World Championship Channel 4 in Daegu, Korea.

Rawling became a presenter and commentator on the paid-subscription boxing channel BoxNation in September 2011. Rawling will be commentator for the 2013 America's Cup.

He returned to BBC 5 Live to commentate on darts, in the 2014 PDC World Championship final. From 2014 John Rawling has commented on the BDO World Darts Championships at the Lakeside Country Club for firstly for BBC Sport then BT Sport & Channel 4 alongside Jim Proudfoot, Paul Nicholson, Chris Mason, Vassos Alexander and Tony Green.

Writing
Rawling has written for a number of UK Newspapers, (in particular The Guardian). He was The Guardian boxing correspondent from 1997 to 2009 following the retirement of John Rodda, and has also written many articles on other sports besides boxing.

Radio
Rawling has made frequent appearances on the BBC Radio 5 Live sports punditry programme Fighting Talk since its first series, and has been known by the nicknames of "J.R." (His initials)  and "Psycho".

Athletics commentary
Athletics fans who attend British events are familiar with his voice, alongside Geoff Wightman, providing stadium commentary.

Personal life
John has three children and lives in Lincolnshire. He is a dog lover, with a devoted German Shepherd Dog 'Millie,' and an enthusiastic golfer.

References

External links
 John Rawling on Ali, BBC
 Article on the 2005 Ashes, Guardian

Living people
Sportspeople from Sheffield
People educated at King Edward VII School, Sheffield
Alumni of the University of Manchester
Boxing commentators
British sports broadcasters
The Guardian journalists
Year of birth missing (living people)
People from Lincolnshire
Golf writers and broadcasters
Association football commentators
Olympic Games broadcasters
Darts commentators